Omar Fuad oglu Buludov (born 15 December 1998) is an Azerbaijani footballer who plays as a defender for Neftçi Baku and the Azerbaijan national team.

Career
Buludov played for Azerbaijan's under-19 team in 2016 and under-21 team in 2018. He made his international debut for Azerbaijan on 9 October 2019 in a friendly match against Bahrain, which finished as a 3–2 away win.

Career statistics

International

References

External links
 
 
 
 

1998 births
Living people
Azerbaijani footballers
Azerbaijan youth international footballers
Azerbaijan under-21 international footballers
Azerbaijan international footballers
Association football defenders
Neftçi PFK players
Azerbaijan Premier League players